Ridge Manuka Maukava (born 2000 or 2001), known by his stage name Nuka, is a New Caledonian beat maker and record producer known for his song "Love Not War (The Tampa Beat)", a collaboration with American R&B singer Jason Derulo. Sony Music released the song on 20 November 2020 as a re-work of Nuka's 2018 composition "4 Brylean (WayzRmx2018)". Nuka produced the track and is an associate performer on it. The song has charted worldwide including on the UK Singles Chart and on charts in Australia, Austria, Belgium, Germany, Sweden, and Switzerland.

Nuka first produced songs in 2017 and released "4 Brylean (WayzRmx2018)" on SoundCloud the following year. At the start of 2020, the instrumental rose in popularity due to a video on social networking platform TikTok with choreography by Tampa Curhat, though Nuka was not credited. According to Nuka, Curhat attempted to claim ownership of the song in August 2020 when contacted by Sony Music, but could not provide the song. The label then got in touch with Nuka through his Facebook page the month after. At the time, Nuka was studying to be a pastry chef at the Saint Jean XXIII  in Païta. He then put his studies on hold to continue his music career after signing with Sony.

Discography

Singles

References

External links
 

2000s births
Living people
New Caledonian people
People from Nouméa
French record producers
Sony Music artists
Year of birth missing (living people)